Knud Vad Thomsen  (March 24, 1905 – February 2, 1971) was a Danish composer.

Notable works

 Aquavitten (1959, Hans Hartvig Seedorff)
 Bissekræmmeren (1947, Nis Petersen)
 Cedric og Beatrice (1951, Jens Louis Petersen)
 De tyve bajere (Poul Sørensen)
 Elefantens vuggevise (1948, Harald H. Lund)
 Forår ved Mariager Fjord (Nis Petersen)
 Jeg plukker fløjsgræs (1951, Sigfred Pedersen)
 Krikken linder det trætte ben (1929, Aage Berntsen)
 Til glæden (Hulde engel) (1938, St. St Blicher)
 Tørresnoren (1955, Sigfred Pedersen)

See also
List of Danish composers

References 

This article was initially translated from the Danish Wikipedia.

Male composers
1905 births
1971 deaths
20th-century Danish composers
20th-century Danish male musicians